"Eelam War" is the name given to several phases of the armed conflict between the government of Sri Lanka and the LTTE: 

Sri Lankan Civil War, between 1983 and 2009
Eelam War I, between 1983 and 1987
Eelam War II, between 1990 and 1995
Eelam War III, between 1995 and 2002
Eelam War IV, between 2006 and 2009